Pyotr Alexeyevich Kropotkin (9 December 1842 – 8 February 1921) was a Russian anarchist, socialist, revolutionary, historian, scientist, philosopher, and activist who advocated anarcho-communism.

Born into an aristocratic land-owning family, Kropotkin attended a military school and later served as an officer in Siberia, where he participated in several geological expeditions. He was imprisoned for his activism in 1874 and managed to escape two years later. He spent the next 41 years in exile in Switzerland, France (where he was imprisoned for almost four years) and England. While in exile, he gave lectures and published widely on anarchism and geography. Kropotkin returned to Russia after the Russian Revolution in 1917, but he was disappointed by the Bolshevik state.

Kropotkin was a proponent of a decentralised communist society free from central government and based on voluntary associations of self-governing communities and worker-run enterprises. He wrote many books, pamphlets and articles, the most prominent being The Conquest of Bread and Fields, Factories, and Workshops, but also Mutual Aid: A Factor of Evolution, his principal scientific offering. He contributed the article on anarchism to the Encyclopædia Britannica Eleventh Edition and left an unfinished work on anarchist ethical philosophy.

Biography

Early life 
Pyotr Kropotkin was born in Moscow, into an ancient Russian princely family. His father, Major General Prince Alexei Petrovich Kropotkin, was a descendant of the Smolensk branch, of the Rurik dynasty which had ruled Russia before the rise of the Romanovs. Kropotkin's father owned large tracts of land and nearly 1,200 male serfs in three provinces. His mother was the daughter of a Cossack general. Pyotr had an older brother, Alexander (1841–1890), who later committed suicide. Their mother died of tuberculosis in 1846. The widowed father married Yelizaveta Markovna Korandina in 1848.

Kropotkin dropped his princely title at age 12 "[u]nder the influence of republican teachings" and "even rebuked his friends, when they so referred to him."

In 1857, at age 14, Kropotkin enrolled in the Corps of Pages at St. Petersburg. Only 150 boys – mostly children of nobility belonging to the court – were educated in this privileged corps, which combined the character of a military school endowed with exclusive rights and of a court institution attached to the Imperial Household. Kropotkin's memoirs detail the hazing and other abuse of pages for which the Corps had become notorious.

In Moscow, Kropotkin developed what would become a lifelong interest in the condition of the peasantry. Although his work as a page for Tsar Alexander II made Kropotkin skeptical about the tsar's "liberal" reputation, Kropotkin was greatly pleased by the tsar's decision to emancipate the serfs in 1861. In St. Petersburg, he read widely on his own account and gave special attention to the works of the French encyclopædists and French history. The years 1857–1861 witnessed a growth in the intellectual forces of Russia, and Kropotkin came under the influence of the new liberal-revolutionary literature, which largely expressed his own aspirations.

In 1862, Kropotkin graduated first in his class from the Corps of Pages and entered the Tsarist army. The members of the corps had the prescriptive right to choose the regiment to which they would be attached. Following a desire to "be someone useful", Kropotkin chose the difficult route of serving in a Cossack regiment in eastern Siberia. For some time, he was aide de camp to the governor of Transbaikalia at Chita. Later he was appointed attaché for Cossack affairs to the governor-general of East Siberia at Irkutsk.

Geographical expeditions in Siberia 
The administrator under whom Kropotkin served, General Boleslar Kazimirovich Kukel, was a liberal and a democrat who maintained personal connections to various Russian radical political figures exiled to Siberia. These included the writer Mikhail Larionovitch Mikhailov, whom Kropotkin (on the orders of Kukel) once warned about the Moscow police's investigation into his political activities in confinement. Mikhailov later gave the young Tsarist functionary a copy of a book by the French anarchist Pierre-Joseph Proudhon — Kropotkin's first introduction to anarchist ideas. Kukel was later dismissed from his administrative position, being transferred, instead, to state-sponsored scientific endeavors.

In 1864, Kropotkin accepted a position in a geographical survey expedition, crossing North Manchuria from Transbaikalia to the Amur, and soon was attached to another expedition up the Sungari River into the heart of Manchuria. The expeditions yielded valuable geographic results. The impossibility of obtaining any real administrative reforms in Siberia now induced Kropotkin to devote himself almost entirely to scientific exploration, in which he continued to be highly successful.

Kropotkin continued his political reading, including works by such prominent liberal thinkers as John Stuart Mill and Alexander Herzen. These readings, along with his experiences among peasants in Siberia, led him to declare himself an anarchist by 1872.

In 1867, Kropotkin resigned his commission in the army and returned to St. Petersburg, where he entered the Saint Petersburg Imperial University to study mathematics, becoming at the same time secretary to the geography section of the Russian Geographical Society. His departure from a family tradition of military service prompted his father to disinherit him, "leaving him a 'prince' with no visible means of support".

In 1871, Kropotkin explored the glacial deposits of Finland and Sweden for the Society. In 1873, he published an important contribution to science, a map and paper in which he showed that the existing maps entirely misrepresented the physical features of Asia; the main structural lines were in fact from southwest to northeast, not from north to south or from east to west as had been previously supposed. During this work, he was offered the secretaryship of the Society, but he had decided that it was his duty not to work at fresh discoveries but to aid in diffusing existing knowledge among the people at large. Accordingly, he refused the offer and returned to St. Petersburg, where he joined the revolutionary party.

Activism in Switzerland and France 

Kropotkin visited Switzerland in 1872 and became a member of the International Workingmen's Association (IWA) at Geneva. However, he found that he did not like IWA's support of state socialism. Instead, he studied the programme of the more anarchist Jura federation at Neuchâtel and spent time in the company of the leading members, adopting the creed of anarchism.

Activism in Russia and arrest 
On returning to Russia, Kropotkin's friend Dmitri Klements introduced him to the Circle of Tchaikovsky, a socialist/populist group created in 1872. Kropotkin worked to spread revolutionary propaganda among peasants and workers, and acted as a bridge between the Circle and the aristocracy. Throughout this period, Kropotkin maintained his position within the Geographical Society to provide cover for his activities.

In March 1874, Kropotkin was arrested and imprisoned in the Peter and Paul Fortress for subversive political activity, as a result of his work with the Circle of Tchaikovsky. Because of his aristocratic background, he received special privileges in prison, such as permission to continue his geographical work in his cell. He delivered his report on the subject of the Ice Age in 1876, where he argued that it had taken place in not as distant a past as initially thought.

Escape and exile 
In June 1876, just before his trial, Kropotkin was moved to a low-security prison in St. Petersburg, from which he escaped with help from his friends. On the night of the escape, Kropotkin and his friends celebrated by dining in one of the finest restaurants in St. Petersburg, assuming correctly that the police would not think to look for them there. After this, he boarded a boat and headed to England. After a short stay there, he moved to Switzerland where he joined the Jura Federation. In 1877, he moved to Paris, where he helped start the socialist movement. In 1878, he returned to Switzerland where he edited the Jura Federation's revolutionary newspaper Le Révolté and published various revolutionary pamphlets.

In 1881, shortly after the assassination of Tsar Alexander II, he was expelled from Switzerland. After a short stay at Thonon (Savoy), he stayed in London for nearly a year. He attended the Anarchist Congress in London from 14 July 1881. Other delegates included Marie Le Compte, Errico Malatesta, Saverio Merlino, Louise Michel, Nicholas Tchaikovsky, and Émile Gautier. While respecting "complete autonomy of local groups", the congress defined propaganda actions that all could follow and agreed that propaganda by the deed was the path to social revolution. The Radical of 23 July 1881 reported that the congress met on 18 July at the Cleveland Hall, Fitzroy Square, with speeches by Marie Le Compte, "the transatlantic agitator", Louise Michel, and Kropotkin. Later, Le Compte and Kropotkin gave talks to the Homerton Social Democratic Club and the Stratford Radical and Dialectical Club.

Kropotkin returned to Thonon in late 1882. Soon he was arrested by the French government, tried at Lyon, and sentenced by a police-court magistrate (under a special law passed on the fall of the Paris Commune) to five years' imprisonment, on the ground that he had belonged to the IWA (1883). The French Chamber repeatedly agitated on his behalf, and he was released in 1886. He was invited to Britain by Henry Seymour and Charlotte Wilson and all three worked on Seymour's newspaper The Anarchist. Soon after, Wilson and Kropotkin split from the individualist anarchist Seymour and founded the anarchist newspaper Freedom Press, which continues to this day. Kropotkin was a regular contributor, while Wilson was integral to the administrative and financial running of the paper until she resigned its editorship in 1895. He settled near London, living at various times in Harrow, then Bromley, where his daughter and only child, Alexandra, was born on 15 April 1887. He also lived for many years in Brighton. While living in London, Kropotkin became friends with a number of prominent English-speaking socialists, including William Morris and George Bernard Shaw.

In 1916, Kropotkin and Jean Grave drafted a document called Manifesto of the Sixteen, which advocated an Allied victory over Germany and the Central Powers during the First World War. Because of the manifesto, Kropotkin found himself isolated by the mainstream of the anarchist movement.

Return to Russia 
In 1917, after the February Revolution, Kropotkin returned to Russia after 40 years of exile. His arrival was greeted by cheering crowds of tens of thousands of people. He was offered the ministry of education in the Provisional Government, which he promptly refused, feeling that working with them would be a violation of his anarchist principles.

His enthusiasm for the changes occurring in the Russian Empire expanded when Bolsheviks seized power in the October Revolution. He had this to say about the October Revolution: "During all the activities of the present revolutionary political parties we must never forget that the October movement of the proletariat, which ended in a revolution, has proved to everybody that a social revolution is within the bounds of possibility. And this struggle, which takes place worldwide, has to be supported by all means – all the rest is secondary. The party of the Bolsheviks was right to adopt the old, purely proletarian name of 'Communist Party'. Even if it does not achieve everything that it would like to, it will nevertheless enlighten the path of the civilised countries for at least a century. Its ideas will slowly be adopted by the peoples in the same way as in the nineteenth century the world adopted the ideas of the Great French Revolution. That is the colossal achievement of the October Revolution. [...] I see the October Revolution as an attempt to bring the preceding February Revolution to its logical conclusion with a transition to communism and federalism."

Although he led a life on the margins of the revolutionary upheaval, Kropotkin became increasingly critical of the methods of the Bolshevik dictatorship and went on to express these feelings in writing. "Unhappily, this effort has been made in Russia under a strongly centralized party dictatorship. This effort was made in the same way as the extremely centralized and Jacobin endeavor of Babeuf. I owe it to you to say frankly that, according to my view, this effort to build a communist republic on the basis of a strongly centralized state communism under the iron law of party dictatorship is bound to end in failure. We are learning to know in Russia how not to introduce communism, even with a people tired of the old regime and opposing no active resistance to the experiments of the new rulers."

Death 

After a year of living in Moscow, Kropotkin moved to the city of Dmitrov in May 1918, where he died of pneumonia on 8 February 1921, at the age of 78. He was buried at the Novodevichy Cemetery in Moscow. Thousands of people marched in his funeral procession, including, with Vladimir Lenin's approval, anarchists carrying banners with anti-Bolshevik slogans. The occasion, the last public demonstration of anarchists in Soviet Russia, saw engaged speeches by Emma Goldman and Aron Baron. In some versions of Kropotkin's The Conquest of Bread, the mini-biography states that this was the last time that Kropotkin's supporters would be allowed to freely rally in public.

Memory 

In 1902, the Kropotkin Range was named after Kropotkin.

On 14 April 1921, two months after Kropotkin's death, the "Romanovski rural area" was incorporated into the town of Kropotkin, Krasnodar Krai, in his honor.

In 1930, Kropotkin, Irkutsk Oblast, a work settlement (labor camp) was named after Kropotkin.

In 1948, the Crimean village Kropotkino  was renamed Kropotkino. 

In 1957, the Dvorets Sovetov station of the Moscow Metro was renamed Kropotkinskaya in his honor.

In 2014, in Dmitrov, the memorial museum of Kropotkin was opened. It operates in the house where Peter Kropotkin lived in 1918–1921 and died. The museum holds memorial documents and a typical interior based on historical photographs.

Philosophy

Critique of capitalism 
Kropotkin pointed out what he considered to be the fallacies of the economic systems of feudalism and capitalism. He believed they create poverty and artificial scarcity, and promote privilege. Instead, he proposed a more decentralized economic system based on mutual aid, mutual support, and voluntary cooperation. He argued that the tendencies for this kind of organization already exist, both in evolution and in human society.

Kropotkin disagreed in part with the Marxist critique of capitalism, including the labour theory of value, believing there was no necessary link between work performed and the values of commodities. His attack on the institution of wage labour was based more on the power employers exerted over employees, and not only on the extraction of surplus value from their labour. Kropotkin claimed this power was made possible by the state's protection of private ownership of productive resources. However, Kropotkin believed the possibility of surplus value was itself the problem, holding that a society would still be unjust if the workers of a particular industry kept their surplus to themselves, rather than redistributing it for the common good.

Critique of state socialism 

Kropotkin believed that a communist society could be established only by a social revolution, which he described as, "... the taking possession by the people of all social wealth. It is the abolition of all the forces which have so long hampered the development of Humanity". However, he criticized forms of revolutionary methods (like those proposed by Marxism and Blanquism) that retained the use of state power, arguing that any central authority was incompatible with the dramatic changes needed by a social revolution. Kropotkin believed that the mechanisms of the state were deeply rooted in maintaining the power of one class over another, and thus could not be used to emancipate the working class. Instead, Kropotkin insisted that both private property and the state needed to be abolished together. The economic change which will result from the Social Revolution will be so immense and so profound, it must so change all the relations based today on property and exchange, that it is impossible for one or any individual to elaborate the different social forms, which must spring up in the society of the future. [...] Any authority external to it will only be an obstacle, only a trammel on the organic labor which must be accomplished, and beside that a source of discord and hatred.Kropotkin believed that any post-revolutionary government would lack the local knowledge to organize a diverse population. Their vision of society would be limited by their own vindictive, self-serving, or narrow ideals. To ensure order, preserve authority, and organize production the state would need to use violence and coercion to suppress further revolution, and control workers. The workers would be reliant on the state bureaucracy to organize them, so they would never develop the initiative to self-organize as they needed. This would lead to the re-creation of classes, an oppressed workforce, and eventually another revolution. Thus, Kropotkin wrote that maintaining the state would paralyze any true social revolution, making the idea of a "revolutionary government" a contradiction in terms:We know that Revolution and Government are incompatible; one must destroy the other, no matter what name is given to government, whether dictator, royalty, or parliament. We know that what makes the strength and the truth of our party is contained in this fundamental formula — “Nothing good or durable can be done except by the free initiative of the people, and every government tends to destroy it;” and so the very best among us, if their ideas had not to pass through the crucible of the popular mind, before being put into execution, and if they should become masters of that formidable machine — the government — and could thus act as they chose, would become in a week fit only for the gallows. We know whither every dictator leads, even the best intentioned, — namely to the death of all revolutionary movement.Rather than a centralized approach, Kropotkin stressed the need for decentralized organization. He believed that dissolving the state would cripple counter-revolution without reverting to authoritarian methods of control, writing, "In order to conquer, something more than guillotines are required. It is the revolutionary idea, the truly wide revolutionary conception, which reduces its enemies to impotence by paralyzing all the instruments by which they have governed hitherto." He believed this was possible only through a widespread "Boldness of thought, a distinct and wide conception of all that is desired, constructive force arising from the people in proportion as the negation of authority dawns; and finally -- the initiative of all in the work of reconstruction -- this will give to the revolution the Power required to conquer."

Kropotkin's applied this criticism to the Bolsheviks' rule following the October Revolution. Kropotkin summarized his thoughts in a 1919 letter to the workers of Western Europe, promoting the possibility of revolution, but also warning against the centralized control in Russia, which he believed had condemned them to failure. Kropotkin wrote to Lenin in 1920, describing the desperate conditions that he believed to be the result of bureaucratic organization, and urging Lenin to allow for local and decentralized institutions. Following an announcement of executions later that year, Kropotkin sent Lenin another furious letter, admonishing the terror which Kropotkin saw as needlessly destructive.

Cooperation and competition 
In 1902, Kropotkin published his book Mutual Aid: A Factor of Evolution, which gave an alternative view of animal and human survival. At the time, some "social Darwinists" such as Francis Galton proffered a theory of interpersonal competition and natural hierarchy. Instead, Kropotkin argued that "it was an evolutionary emphasis on cooperation instead of competition in the Darwinian sense that made for the success of species, including the human". In the last chapter, he wrote:

Kropotkin did not deny the presence of competitive urges in humans, but did not consider them the driving force of human history. He believed that seeking out conflict proved to be socially beneficial only in attempts to destroy injustice, as well as authoritarian institutions such as the state or the Russian Orthodox Church, which he saw as stifling human creativity and impeding human instinctual drive towards cooperation.

Kropotkin claimed that the benefits arising from mutual organization incentivizes humans more than mutual strife. His hope was that in the long run, mutual organization would drive individuals to produce. Anarcho-primitivists and anarcho-communists believe that a gift economy can break the cycle of poverty. They rely on Kropotkin, who believed that the hunter-gatherers he had visited implemented mutual aid.

Mutual aid 

In his 1892 book The Conquest of Bread, Kropotkin proposed a system of economics based on mutual exchanges made in a system of voluntary cooperation. He believed that in a society that is socially, culturally, and industrially developed enough to produce all the goods and services it needs, there would be no obstacle, such as preferential distribution, pricing or monetary exchange, to prevent everyone to take what they need from the social product. He supported the eventual abolition of money or tokens of exchange for goods and services.

Kropotkin believed that Mikhail Bakunin's collectivist economic model was just a wage system by a different name and that such a system would breed the same type of centralization and inequality as a capitalist wage system. He stated that it is impossible to determine the value of an individual's contributions to the products of social labour, and thought that anyone who was placed in a position of trying to make such determinations would wield authority over those whose wages they determined.

According to Kirkpatrick Sale, "[w]ith Mutual Aid especially, and later with Fields, Factories, and Workshops, Kropotkin was able to move away from the absurdist limitations of individual anarchism and no-laws anarchism that had flourished during this period and provide instead a vision of communal anarchism, following the models of independent cooperative communities he discovered while developing his theory of mutual aid. It was an anarchism that opposed centralized government and state-level laws as traditional anarchism did, but understood that at a certain small scale, communities and communes and co-ops could flourish and provide humans with a rich material life and wide areas of liberty without centralized control."

Self-sufficiency 
Kropotkin's focus on local production led to his view that a country should strive for self-sufficiencymanufacture its own goods and grow its own food, lessening dependence on imports. To these ends, he advocated irrigation and greenhouses to boost local food production.

Criticism
Pro-Bolshevik anarchist and revolutionary Juda Grossman criticized Kropotkin’s militaristic position during the period of imperialist war, he revealed the contradictions of Kropotkin the militarist. Kropotkin's statement, "let’s cast guns and move them into position," sparked an ideological crisis for many. Many saw this as a crushing blow and an irrevocable harm to the importance and longevity of any ideological pretensions he might have had.

Works

Books 
 In Russian and French Prisons, London: Ward and Downey; 1887. 
 The Conquest of Bread (Paris, 1892) Project Gutenberg e-text, Project LibriVox audiobook
 The Great French Revolution, 1789–1793 (French original: Paris, 1893; English translation: London, 1909). e-text (in French), Anarchist Library e-text (in English)
 The Terror in Russia, 1909, RevoltLib e-text
 Words of a Rebel, 1885, 
 Fields, Factories, and Workshops (London and New York, 1898).
 Memoirs of a Revolutionist, London: Smith, Elder; 1899. Anarchist Library e-text, Anarchy Archives e-text
 Mutual Aid: A Factor of Evolution (London, 1902) Project Gutenberg e-text, Project LibriVox audiobook
 Modern Science and Anarchism, 1903, *
 Russian Literature: Ideals and Realities (New York: A. A. Knopf, 1905). Anarchy Archives e-text
 The State: Its Historic Role, published 1946, 
 Ethics: Origin and Development (unfinished). Included as first part of Origen y evolución de la moral (Spanish e-text)

Pamphlets 

 An Appeal to the Young (1880)
 Communism and Anarchy (1901)
 Anarchist Communism: Its Basis and Principles (1887)
 The Industrial Village of the Future (1884)
 Law and Authority (1886)
 The Coming Anarchy (1887)
 The Place of Anarchy in Socialist Evolution (1886)
 The Wage System (1920)
 The Commune of Paris (1880)
 Anarchist Morality (1898)
 Expropriation 
 The Great French Revolution and Its Lesson (1909)
 Process Under Socialism (1887)
 Are Prisons Necessary? Chapter X from "In Russian and French Prisons" (1887)
 The Coming War (1913)
 Wars and Capitalism (1914)
 Revolutionary Government (1892)
 The Scientific Basis of Anarchy (1887)
 The Fortress Prison of St. Petersburg (1883)
 Advice to Those About to Emigrate (1893)
 Some of the Resources of Canada (1898)
 Anarchism: Its Philosophy and Ideal (1896)
 Revolutionary Studies (1892)
 Direct Action of Environment and Evolution (1920)
 The Present Crisis in Russia (1901)
 The Spirit of Revolt (1880)
 The State: Its Historic Role (1897)
 On Economics Selected Passages from his Writings (1898–1913)
 On the Teaching of Physiography (1893)
 War! (1914)

Articles 

 "The Constitutional Agitation in Russia," 1905.
 "Brain Work and Manual Work," 1890.
 "Manifesto of the Sixteen," 1916.
 "Organized Vengeance Called 'Justice.'"
 "A Proposed Communist Settlement: A New Colony for Tyneside or Wearside." 
 "What Geography Ought to Be," 1885.
 "Organized Vengeance Called 'Justice'"
 "On Order"
 "Maxím Górky," 1904
 "Research on the Ice age", Notices of the Imperial Russian Geographical Society, 1876.
 "Baron Toll", The Geographical Journal, Vol. 23, No. 6. (Jun. 1904), pp. 770–772, JSTOR
 "The population of Russia", The Geographical Journal, Vol. 10, No. 2. (Aug. 1897), pp. 196–202, JSTOR
 "The old beds of the Amu-Daria", The Geographical Journal, Vol. 12, No. 3. (Sep. 1898), pp. 306–310, JSTOR
 "Russian Schools and the Holy Synod," 1902
 Mr. Mackinder; Mr. Ravenstein; Dr. Herbertson; Prince Kropotkin; Mr. Andrews; Cobden Sanderson; Elisée Reclus, "On Spherical Maps and Reliefs: Discussion", The Geographical Journal, Vol. 22, No. 3. (Sep. 1903), pp. 294–299, JSTOR
 "The desiccation of Eur-Asia", Geographical Journal, 23 (1904), 722–41.
 "Finland" in Encyclopædia Britannica (11th ed.), 1911 (in part; with Joseph R. Fisher and John Scott Keltie)
 "Finland: A Rising Nationality," Nineteenth Century, 1885
 “Anarchism” in Encyclopædia Britannica (11th ed.), 1911
 "Anti-militarism. Was it properly understood?", Freedom, vol.XXVIII, no. 307 (November 1914), pp. 82–83. 
 "An open letter of Peter Kropotkin to the Western workingmen", The Railway Review (29 June 1917), p. 4.

See also 
 Anarcho-communism
 Anarchist schools of thought
 Golets Kropotkin
 Katorga
 Kropotkin family
 List of Russian anarchists

Explanatory notes

References

Further reading

Books on Kropotkin 

 Butterworth, Alex. The World That Never Was: A True Story of Dreamers, Schemers, Anarchists and Secret Police (Pantheon Books, 2010)
 
 Davis, Mike (2018). Chapter 3: "The Coming Desert: Kropotkin, Mars and the Pulse of Asia". Old Gods, New Enigmas: Marx's Lost Theory. Verso Books.
 
 
 
 
 Miller, Martin A. (1976). Kropotkin. University of Chicago Press.

Journal articles 
 
 
 
 Efremenko D., Evseeva Y. (December 2012). "Studies of Social Solidarity in Russia: Tradition and Modern Trends". NY: Springer Science+Business Media. American Sociologist, v. 43, 2012, no. 4, pp. 349–365. .
 
 Morris, Brian (October 2008). Basic Kropotkin: Kropotkin and the History of Anarchism. Anarchist Communist Editions pamphlet no. 17 (The Anarchist Federation).
 "Prince P. A. Kropotkin". Obituaries. Nature. 3 February 1921. Vol. 106, no. 2675 . pp. 735–736.

External links 

 
 
 

 Kropotkin Museum
 peterkropotkin.org

 
1842 births
1921 deaths
Writers from Moscow
People from Moskovsky Uyezd
Rurikids
Russian anarchists
Russian anti-fascists
Russian atheist writers
Russian atheists
Russian communists
Russian exiles
Russian explorers
Russian geographers
Russian memoirists
Russian newspaper editors
Russian non-fiction writers
Russian political writers
Russian revolutionaries
Russian science writers
Russian social commentators
Russian socialists
Anarchist theorists
Anarchist writers
Anarcho-communists
Anti-consumerists
Historians of the French Revolution
Historians of the Renaissance
Human geographers
Members of the International Workingmen's Association
Narodniks
Philosophy academics
Philosophy writers
Political philosophers
Social philosophers
19th-century atheists
19th-century essayists
19th-century philosophers
19th-century non-fiction writers from the Russian Empire
19th-century philosophers from the Russian Empire
19th-century zoologists from the Russian Empire
20th-century atheists
20th-century essayists
20th-century Russian non-fiction writers
20th-century Russian philosophers
Emigrants from the Russian Empire to France
Emigrants from the Russian Empire to Switzerland
Emigrants from the Russian Empire to the United Kingdom
Prisoners of the Peter and Paul Fortress
Burials at Novodevichy Cemetery